Rajya Sabha elections were held on various dates in 2003, to elect members of the Rajya Sabha, Indian Parliament's upper chamber. Three members from Kerala and one member from Puducherry were elected.

Elections
Elections were held to elect members from various states.

Members elected
The following members are elected in the elections held in 2003. They are members for the term 2003–2009 and retire in year 2009, except in case of the resignation or death before the term.
The list is incomplete.

State - Member - Party

Bye-elections
The following bye elections were held in the year 2003.

State - Member - Party

 Chhattisgarh - Kamla Manhar - INC ( ele  18/09/2003 term till 02/04/2006 ) dea of Manhar Bhagatram

References

2003 elections in India
2003